Beinn a' Choin (769 m) is a mountain in the Grampian Mountains of Scotland. It lies on the border of the Stirling region and Argyll at the northern end of Loch Lomond.

A rugged and wild mountain of rocks and moorland lying north of Ben Lomond, it usually climbed from the small settlement of Inversnaid.

References

Marilyns of Scotland
Corbetts
Mountains and hills of Stirling (council area)
Mountains and hills of Argyll and Bute
Mountains and hills of the Southern Highlands